Nivsky is a rural inhabited locality under the administrative jurisdiction of the town of Kandalaksha, Murmansk Oblast, Russia.

Nivsky was founded in 1929 as a settlement for the construction workers building a hydroelectric plant. Work settlement status was granted to it on June 6, 1933 by the Resolution of the Central Executive Committee of the Karelian ASSR, but it was demoted to a rural locality in 1995. When Kandalakshsky District of the Karelian ASSR was transferred to Murmansk Oblast in 1938, Nivsky became a part of the latter.

References

Notes

Sources

Rural localities in Murmansk Oblast
Kandalakshsky District